The Welsh Football League (also known as the Nathaniel Car Sales Welsh Football League for sponsorship reasons) was a club football league in Wales. For its final season in 2019–20 season it operated at levels 3 and 4 of the Welsh football league system. Level 3 – the Welsh Football League Division One and level 4 Welsh Football League Division Two. It folded in 2020 after the Football Association of Wales took over the running of tier 3 leagues and the responsibility for tier 4 passed to regional football associations.

The Welsh Football League's history stretches back to 1904 when the competition was first formed and Aberdare were crowned first champions of a seven-team First Division. Abergavenny were champions of Division 2 and Trelewis the winners of Division 3.

The first season in 1904–05
In April 1904, the Merthyr Express newspaper reported that a new football league would be formed in addition to the South Wales League which had been in existence since 1891.

This new competition would be named the Rhymney Valley League and the reason for its creation was due to the South Wales League being overly dominated by Cardiff clubs, though the number of teams from Cardiff barely numbered more than a couple in any one season.

Structure
Division 1 of the League operated at the 2nd level of the Welsh system, until 2019–20, when it was replaced at that level by the FAW Championship.

Former divisions
 Welsh Football League Division One
 Welsh Football League Division Two
 Welsh Football League Division Three

References

 
Football leagues in Wales
Sports leagues established in 1904
1904 establishments in Wales
2020 disestablishments in Wales
Sports leagues disestablished in 2020
Defunct football competitions in Wales